Søren Galatius (born 1 August 1976) is a Danish mathematician who works as a professor of mathematics at the University of Copenhagen. He works in algebraic topology, where one of his most important results concerns the homology of the automorphisms of free groups. He is also known for his joint work with Oscar Randal-Williams on moduli spaces of manifolds, comprising several papers.

Life  
Galatius was born in Randers, Denmark. He earned his PhD from Aarhus University in 2004 under the supervision of Ib Madsen. He then joined the Stanford University faculty, first with a temporary position as a Szegő Assistant Professor and then two years later with a tenure-track position, eventually becoming full professor in 2011. He relocated to the University of Copenhagen in 2016.

Recognition  
In 2010, Galatius won the Silver Medal of the Royal Danish Academy of Sciences and Letters.
In 2012, he became one of the inaugural fellows of the American Mathematical Society.
He was an invited speaker at the 2014 International Congress of Mathematicians, speaking about his joint work with Oscar Randal-Williams. In 2017, he won an Eilte Research Prize from the Danish Government for his work. In 2022 he was awarded the Clay Research Award jointly with Oscar Randal-Williams.

Selected publications

References

External links 
 

1976 births
Living people
Danish mathematicians
21st-century American mathematicians
Aarhus University alumni
Stanford University Department of Mathematics faculty
Fellows of the American Mathematical Society
People from Randers
Topologists
Academic staff of the University of Copenhagen